Wilkes Hosiery Mills is a historic textile mill located near North Wilkesboro, Wilkes County, North Carolina. The brick mill was built in sections between about 1923 and 1967. The 1947 additions and remodeling was carried out by the Charlotte firm Biberstein & Bowles.  The textile mill remained in operation until the mid-1960s, after which it was occupied by the Key City Furniture Company until 2003.

It was listed on the National Register of Historic Places in 2008.

References

Industrial buildings and structures on the National Register of Historic Places in North Carolina
Textile mills in North Carolina
Industrial buildings completed in 1923
Buildings and structures in Wilkes County, North Carolina
National Register of Historic Places in Wilkes County, North Carolina